Nancy Baker may refer to:

 Nancy Landon Kassebaum Baker, known as Nancy Kassebaum (born 1932), American politician
 Nancy Baker Tompkins, American businesswoman